Dietramszell is a municipality in the district of Bad Tölz-Wolfratshausen in Bavaria, Germany. The community of 5,282 (2005) residents sits 685 meters above sea level.

The idyllic community became internationally known after the "torture prince affair"  and subsequently for its hesitation to strip Paul von Hindenburg and Adolf Hitler of their honorary citizenships.

References

External links
 Photos of the interior of several churches in Dietramszell, in the Warburg Institute Iconographic Database